Carlos Anguiano (born September 13, 1999) is an American professional soccer player who plays as a central midfielder for Phoenix Rising FC in the USL Championship.

Career
Born in Salem, Oregon, Anguiano began playing soccer from the age of seven and was playing for Capital FC Timbers when he joined the Portland Timbers youth academy in 2015. Anguiano made his professional debut with Portland Timbers 2, the club's reserve team, as an amateur player against Reno 1868 on July 23, 2017. He came on as an 84th–minute substitute for Russell Cicerone as Timbers 2 drew the match 1–1.

On January 30, 2019, it was announced that Anguiano had signed a professional contract with Portland Timbers 2. Prior to him signing with Timbers 2, Anguiano was set on enrolling at the University of North Carolina and join the North Carolina Tar Heels before deciding to turn professional.

On September 1, 2019, Anguiano scored his first professional goal for Timbers 2 in a 3–1 victory over Reno 1868 in the USL Championship. He then scored the second goal of his career on September 21 in a 6–3 victory over Tacoma Defiance. On October 3, it was announced that Anguiano was ranked seventh in USL Championship's 20 Under 20 list for the 2019 season.

On December 15, 2020, Anguiano joined Tacoma Defiance ahead of their 2021 season.

Anguiano signed with Phoenix Rising FC on December 20, 2021.

Career statistics

References

External links 
 Portland Timbers profile.

1999 births
Living people
Sportspeople from Salem, Oregon
American soccer players
Portland Timbers 2 players
Tacoma Defiance players
Phoenix Rising FC players
Association football midfielders
Soccer players from Oregon
USL Championship players